Ednooki or One-eyed (Macedonia Cyrillic: Еднооки) was a satirical animated show from Kontrabanda Produkcija from North Macedonia. The show was first aired in April 2006 on A1, later on Kanal 5 till 2007 and currently on Alfa TV.

Pay per view
Since September 2014 the show has been available via pay per view on www.parahodot.tv

See also
Vo Centar
Milenko Nedelkovski Show
Jadi Burek
Eden na Eden

External links
Official Twitter Page
Video of the lost Episode (S09E01)

References

2000s Macedonian television series
2006 Macedonian television series debuts
2010s Macedonian television series
Macedonian animated television series
A1 Televizija original programming